Cornelius O'Brien (fl. 1656), Irish musician.

O'Brien is one of the few Irish musicians noted in the 17th century. A piper, in 1656 he was Sentenced to receive twenty lashes on the bare back and transported to Barbados.

See also

 Tadhg Ó Cobhthaigh, poet and musician, fl. 1554.
 Donell Dubh Ó Cathail, musician, c. 1560s – c.1660.
 Cearbhall Óg Ó Dálaigh, poet and musician, fl. 1630.
 David Murphy (composer), composer and harper, fl. early 17th century.

External links
 http://billhaneman.ie/IMM/IMM-IV.html

Irish uilleann pipers
17th-century Irish musicians
Year of birth missing
Year of death missing